Saint Ermengol (also Armengol or Armengod) or Hermengaudius (died 1035) was the bishop of Urgell from 1010.

Possibly born in the village of Ayguatébia, he was the son of Bernat I, viscount of Conflent, and of his wife Guisla de Lluçià, and also the nephew and successor of Bishop Sal·la and a member of the family of the counts of Conflent.

By 1002 Ermengol was an archdeacon and the following year the Bishop of Urgell, Sal·la, had made arrangements for Emermengol to succeed him. He began his episcopate by reforming the cathedral canons, along the lines of the life of Saint Augustine of Hippo, and granting them land in Vallespir, Cerdanya, and Alt Urgell. In 1012, he travelled to Rome for an audience with Pope Benedict VIII, who confirmed the possessions of his bishopric and its jurisdiction, including over Ribagorza. In 1017, Ermengol was involved in the establishment of the bishopric of Roda, consecrated Borrell as bishop and received recognition by that bishop of his superiority in the local hierarchy. He is credited with the recaptured and rechristianization of the city of Guissona in 1024.

He was often at odds with the nobility of Urgell and he assisted in the construction of many public works. He built the cathedral of Urgell, which was consecrated in 1040 by his successor, Eribau. For these public acts, he is celebrated annually in the Fair of Saint Ermengol. He died in 1035 while assisting in the construction of a bridge near El Pont de Bar. The year following his death he was venerated and a few years later was canonised. His feast day is 3 November.

References

11th-century Catalan bishops
1035 deaths
11th-century Christian saints
Year of birth unknown

de:Armengol